Uherce Mineralne  (Uhertsi Mineral’ni) is a village in the administrative district of Gmina Olszanica, within Lesko County, Subcarpathian Voivodeship, in south-eastern Poland.

The village has a population of 1,400.

References

Villages in Lesko County